George Kuntu Blankson is the member of parliament for the constituency. He was elected on the ticket of the National Democratic Congress (NDC) and won a majority of 1,734 votes to become the MP. He had represented the constituency in the 4th Republic parliament.

Members of Parliament

See also
List of Ghana Parliament constituencies

References 

Parliamentary constituencies in the Central Region (Ghana)